Charles Edwin "Charley" Ackerly (January 3, 1898 – August 16, 1982)  was an American wrestler who competed in the 1920 Summer Olympics. He was a 1920 graduate of Cornell University where he competed for the Cornell Big Red wrestling team under Coach Walter O'Connell. Ackerly was also a member of the Kappa Delta Rho fraternity and Sphinx Head Society.

He competed for the United States in the 1920 Summer Olympics held in Antwerp, Belgium in the freestyle featherweight division, winning the gold medal. He was the only American wrestler to win gold during the 1920 Olympics, and was given a hero's welcome in his hometown of Cuba following his return from Antwerp.

Ackerly was inducted into the Helms Foundation National Amateur Wrestling Hall of Fame in 1960 and Cornell's Hall of Fame in 1981.

After his wrestling career, he worked as a lawyer in Detroit, Michigan before retiring to Clearwater, Florida.

References

External links
 Charles Ackerly's profile at databaseOlympics
 

1898 births
1982 deaths
Wrestlers at the 1920 Summer Olympics
American male sport wrestlers
Olympic gold medalists for the United States in wrestling
Cornell University alumni
Medalists at the 1920 Summer Olympics
People from Cuba, New York
People from Clearwater, Florida